Ivan Yates (born 23 October 1959) is an Irish broadcaster, businessman and former politician. He was elected as a Fine Gael Teachta Dála (TD) for the Wexford constituency at the 1981 general election and at each election until his retirement from politics in 2002. He also served as Minister for Agriculture, Food and Forestry from 1994 to 1997.

Early life
Yates was born in Enniscorthy, County Wexford. He was educated at Aravon School, Bray; St. Columba's Church of Ireland College in Rathfarnham, Dublin; and Gurteen Agricultural College, County Tipperary.

Political career
When he was first elected in 1981, Yates was the youngest member of the 22nd Dáil and is also the fifth-youngest ever member of Dáil Éireann at the age of 21. He became involved in local politics when he became a member of Wexford County Council, serving until 1995 and again from 1999 to 2004. He joined the Fine Gael front bench in 1988 and was appointed Minister for Agriculture, Food and Forestry when the party came to power in 1994.

Yates oversaw a particularly difficult period for Irish agriculture. Farmers saw the prices they received for their produce plummet; he stopped live animal exports in response to controversy over cruelty in shipping, and took on the Irish Veterinary Union over the tuberculosis eradication scheme. He also had to deal with a sharp rise in the number of BSE cases during 1996, and the consequent banning of Irish beef by Russia. When John Bruton resigned as leader of Fine Gael in January 2001, there was much speculation that Yates would be a contender for the vacant position. Instead, he announced to his colleagues that he was leaving full-time politics to concentrate on his family and business interests and that he would not be contesting the next general election.

He receives annual pension payments of €74,836 from his time in politics.

Business career
Yates was the chairman and managing director of Celtic Bookmakers, an Irish chain of betting shops, and expanded the company from its Wexford base to a chain of 64 shops around the country at its peak. On 4 January 2011, it was announced that the company had gone into receivership.

He headed a group of bookmakers in a court case against the British Horseracing Board (BHB) over fees for licences to access a racing information database in 2005. The issue was resolved in the High Court with the termination of the BHB's licence agreement and a payment of €300,000 to the bookmakers, who were reported to have access to the BHB's former database until 9 January 2006.

In 2011, he described the Irish bankruptcy process as "purgatory", and publicly announced that he was contemplating moving to the UK to avail of the British bankruptcy process.

On 21 August 2012, the High Court in Dublin dismissed an attempt by Allied Irish Banks to have him declared bankrupt.

In September 2013, it was announced that Yates was discharged from bankruptcy, having fulfilled the requirements set down by Swansea County Court, where he made his application for personal insolvency on 24 August 2012.

Media work
Yates co-presented the Newstalk breakfast show from 2009, firstly with Claire Byrne and subsequently with Chris Donoghue. On 23 March 2012, he announced he would be leaving both the station and his column in the Irish Examiner with effect from 6 April 2012, to concentrate on his personal finances. He also presented Tonight with Vincent Browne on TV3 during summer 2011.

He returned to Newstalk in September 2013, once again co-presenting the breakfast show with Chris Donoghue.

Yates is a regular conference speaker, motivational speaker and MC at business events in Ireland.

He co-hosted The Tonight Show on TV3 and presented The Hard Shoulder on Newstalk until his retirement from broadcasting in July 2020. Kieran Cuddihy replaced Yates as the host of The Hard Shoulder in September 2020.

References

External links

 

1959 births
Living people
Fine Gael TDs
Newstalk presenters
Members of the 22nd Dáil
Members of the 23rd Dáil
Members of the 24th Dáil
Members of the 25th Dáil
Members of the 26th Dáil
Members of the 27th Dáil
Members of the 28th Dáil
People educated at St Columba's College, Dublin
People from Enniscorthy
Politicians from County Wexford
Virgin Media Television (Ireland) presenters
Ministers for Agriculture (Ireland)
Local councillors in County Wexford
Irish businesspeople